San Wai Tsai is the name of two villages in Hong Kong:
 San Wai Tsai (Tai Po District) in Tai Po District
 San Wai Tsai (Tuen Mun) in Tuen Mun